Beed Kh. village is located in Khalapur Tehsil of Raigad district in Maharashtra, India. It is situated 13 km away from sub-district headquarter Khalapur and 66 km away from district headquarter Alibag. Beed Khurd is the gram panchayat of Beed Kh village.

The total geographical area of village is 495.07 hectares. Beed Kh has a total population of 1,344 peoples. There are about 277 houses in Beed Kh village. Khopoli & Karjat is nearest town to Beed Kh.

Temple
 Bramhnath Gramdevata
 Hanuman Mandir
 Shankar Mandir  A fair is held in honour of the temple deity on Mahashivaratri day - Maagha Vadya 13.
 Vitthal Rukhmini Mandir
 Ram Mandir
 Datta Mandir
 Karnjai Devi
 Gautam Buddha Vihar

School
RGP Marathi Shala Beed Kh.

References

Villages in Raigad district